Rhinecanthus assasi, commonly known as the Assasi triggerfish or Arabian picassofish, is a species of fish in the family Balistidae, the triggerfishes.

Description 

Rhinecanthus assasi reaches up to 30 centimeters long. It is tan above and white below with blue stripes between and below the eyes. It feeds mostly on invertebrates.

Habitat and distribution 

R. assasi mostly lives in or near coral reefs. It occurs in the western Indian Ocean, including the Red Sea and Persian Gulf.

References

External links
 

Balistidae
Fish of the Indian Ocean
Taxa named by Peter Forsskål
Fish described in 1775